Sigal may refer to:

People

Surname
 Clancy Sigal (1926-2017), American writer
 Israel Michael Sigal, Canadian mathematician
 Ellen V. Sigal, chairperson of Friends of Cancer Research
 Isaak Sigal (born 1927), Ukrainian scientist
 Leonid Sigal, Russian violinist 
 Lisa Sigal (born 1962), American contemporary artist
 Alex Sigal, virologist, biologist

Given name

 Sigal Avin, American-Israeli writer
 Sigal Bujman, Israeli filmmaker
 Sigal Erez, American actress
 Sigal Gottlieb, American applied mathematician
 Sigal Mandelker, American lawyer
 Sigal Shachmon (born 1971), Israeli model

Places
 Sigal, Sakastan

Other
 SIGAL (insurance company)